Monochamus maculosus, the spotted pine sawyer, is a species of beetle in the family Cerambycidae. It is known from Canada and the United States, and was formerly known as Monochamus mutator.

References

maculosus
Beetles described in 1847